Brookdale is an unincorporated community and census-designated place (CDP) in Bloomfield Township, located within Essex County, New Jersey, United States. It is generally considered to be the part of Bloomfield north of Bay Avenue, As of the 2010 United States Census, the CDP's total population was 9,239.

History
The original English name of Brookdale was Stone House Plains. "Stone House" referred to a rock formation known as the stone house or great rock, supposedly once suitable as a shelter, just north of the present-day intersection of Bellevue Avenue and Newell Drive.  The rock was still present in 1802 but was removed not long afterward. "Plains" referred to the plains of the segment of the Yantecaw River which passes through the area.

Within a decade or so of the turn of the 18th century, settlers, possibly including Abraham Van Giesen, had begun to populate the area along Bellevue Avenue. By about 1750, two brothers, Garrabrant and Teunis Garrabrant, born in 1723 and 1726, respectively, to Cornelius and Jannetje (Pier) Gerbrandsen in Bergen (now Jersey City), owned sizeable tracts in the vicinity of Brookdale Park, Bellevue Avenue, and Broad Street. Circa 1730, Alexander Cockefair, born about 1696 in Bushwick, purchased a "plantation" roughly bounded by the Yantacaw Brook, and modern-day Broad Street and Watchung Avenue. The Sigler and Coeyman families also had very early farms in Stone House Plains. Descendants of these families operated farms, mills, and other businesses in the area for over two centuries.

Dutch was the primary language for many residents through the 18th century. In 1795, the Dutch Reformed Church of Stone House Plains (now Brookdale Reformed Church) was formed, creating a spiritual and social focal point for the community. The original church edifice was built in 1802; it burned and was rebuilt about 1857. The Morris family, which operated mills just south of Brookdale, made a mill pond on the Yantacaw Brook. In the mid-1800s, residents established the first school. In 1873, on the eve of US mail delivery service, the community voted to change the name to Brookdale.

After World War I, much of the farmland was developed into residential housing. The Clark Thread Company bought the Morris Pond (now Clark's Pond) and built an adjoining thread-coloring factory, later occupied by the Scientific Glass Company. Portions of the Cockefair farm were converted into a golf course and a junior high school (now Bloomfield Middle School). Essex County acquired and built Brookdale Park. In 1968, the petrochemical engineering firm Lummus Company set up in northern Brookdale.

Geography
According to the United States Census Bureau, the CDP had a total area of 1.607 square miles (4.163 km2), including 1.603 square miles (4.152 km2) of land and 0.004 square miles (0.011 km2) of water (0.26%).

Demographics

Census 2010

References

Bloomfield, New Jersey
Census-designated places in Essex County, New Jersey